Union for a Better Future of BiH  ( or SBB BiH) is a Bosniak centre-right political party in Bosnia and Herzegovina. The party was founded in September 2009 by Fahrudin Radončić, the founder and owner of Dnevni avaz, the largest daily newspaper in Bosnia and Herzegovina.

As of 20 April 2017, the party has over 76,000 members.

List of presidents

Elections

Parliamentary elections

Presidency elections

Cantonal elections

References

External links
Official web site

Bosniak political parties in Bosnia and Herzegovina
Bosnian nationalism
Civic nationalism
Pro-European political parties in Bosnia and Herzegovina
Conservative parties in Bosnia and Herzegovina
Political parties established in 2009
2009 establishments in Bosnia and Herzegovina
Secularism in Bosnia and Herzegovina